Eden is an Australian streaming television drama series from Stan. The eight part series was released on 11 June 2021.

Premise
Eden follows a devastating chain of events which lays bare the dark, hidden heart of paradise triggered after the disappearance of a young woman.

Cast

Main cast 
 Sophie Wilde as Scout
 Bebe Bettencourt as Hedwig
 Keiynan Lonsdale as Cam
 Cody Fern as Andy Dolan
 Cassandra Sorrell as Cora Lee
 Claude Jabbour as Ben Drysdale
 Alexandria Steffensen as Saranya
 Christopher James Baker as Gracie
 Samuel Johnson as Ezra Katz
 Shakira Clanton as Laura O'Shea
 Brad McMurray as Kai Murray
 Dustin Clare as Huckleberry
 Anastasia Usoltseva as Eilish
 Rachael Blake as Katia Van Der Linden
 Cassandra Sorrell as Cora Lee
 Leeanna Walsman as Octavia Gracie
 Priscilla Doueihy as Gina

Recurring cast 

 Thom Green as  Bodie Palmer
 Mimana Kiel as Daylah
 Benedict Hardie as Laith Palmer
 Genevieve Lemon as Fiona Palmer
 Caroline Oayda as Elke
 Megan O'Connell as Pilot
 Hunter Page-Lochard as Fred
Christian Wilkins as Leander

Guest appearance 

 Phoebe Adams as  Annie
 Alyla Browne as Young Hedwig
 Cheree Cassidy as Newsreader
 Martin Dingle-Wall as David Cohen
 Peter Russell Clarke as Johnny Bobbin
 Victoria Haralabidou as Drysdale's Mother
 Elke Hinrichsen as Drug Deal

Episodes

Production
Eden was created by writer-director Vanessa Gazy in collaboration with Every Cloud Productions' Fiona Eagger and Deb Cox and Balloon Entertainment’s Bryan Elsley. It is produced by Fiona McConaghy and directors include John Curran and Mirrah Foulkes and Peter Andrikidis. The series has an all female writing team consisting of Jessica Brittain, Anya Beyersdorf, Penelope Chai, Clare Sladden, Vanessa Gazy.

Filming
The series is filmed in Byron Bay and the Northern Rivers region of New South Wales.

Release
The first trailer for the series was released on 13 May 2021. On the same day it was also announced that all 8 episodes of the series would be released on Stan on 11 June 2021.

References

External links
 
 

2020s Australian drama television series
English-language television shows
Television shows set in New South Wales
Stan (service) original programming